Necroticism – Descanting the Insalubrious is the third album by British extreme metal band Carcass. It was released on 30 October 1991 through Earache Records. This album is the first to feature guitarist Michael Amott and marked the first time Carcass had recorded as a four-piece. Many of the tracks describe economical ways to dispose of dead bodies. Necroticism continues the move towards a predominant death metal sound which was started in Symphonies of Sickness, featuring songs with longer sections and complex structures, more akin to the then-burgeoning technical death metal subgenre.

Release 
Necroticism was originally released on 21 October 1991 through Earache Records. The album was re-released in 2008 as part of an ongoing series of Carcass reissues, to tie in with their reunion. The main album is presented as one side of a dualdisc, while the DVD side features the third part of an extended documentary titled The Pathologist's Report Part III: Mass Infection, and a 23-minute interview with Walker and Amott from 1993, recorded on the Gods of Grind tour. Later editions of the reissue contain the album on a CD and the documentary on a separate DVD. Also included in the reissue is a set of four art cards. The reissue is presented in a 12-panel digipak with full lyrics and artwork.

Musical style 
Ken Owen and Jeff Walker said during The Pathologist's Report Part III: Mass Infection that they rejected the descriptions of Carcass's music on this album being grindcore. While Owen acknowledges its death metal characteristics, both he and Walker expressed that they are more inclined towards calling their music on this album "progressive".

Reception 

AllMusic gave Necroticism four out of five stars, stating that the worthy addition of Michael Amott made the record an excellent guitarist's album. Kerrang! notably gave the album a perfect score in their 364th magazine issue. Metal Storm gave Necroticism a 9.6/10 calling it a masterpiece and a transitional album that every metalhead should own (melodic or extreme) and suggested that people should buy the album immediately.

Accolades 
In 2005, Necroticism was ranked number 294 in Rock Hard magazine's book of The 500 Greatest Rock & Metal Albums of All Time. In September 2005, Necroticism was inducted into the Decibel Magazine Hall of Fame, being the eighth album overall to be featured in the Decibel Hall of Fame.

Track listing

Credits 
Writing, performance and production credits are adapted from the album liner notes.

Personnel

Carcass 
 Jeffrey Walker – bass, lead vocals
 Michael Amott – guitars, backing vocals
 Bill Steer – guitars, co-lead vocals
 Ken Owen – drums, backing vocals

Production 
 Colin Richardson – production, mixing
 Carcass – mixing
 Keith Hartley – engineering
 Ian McFarlane – assistance
 Dave Buchmann – assistance
 John Paul – remastering

Visual art 
 Carcass – cover art
 Tom Warner – layout

Studios 
 Amazon Studios, Simonswood, UK – recording
 Mine Music – remastering

References

External links 
 
 Necroticism: Descanting the Insalubrious at Earache Records
 

1991 albums
Carcass (band) albums
Earache Records albums